Frédéric Alexandre Tejou (born 13 July 1987) is a Guadeloupean professional footballer who plays as a goalkeeper for the club La Gauloise, and the Guadeloupe national team.

International career
Ajax debuted with the Guadeloupe national team in a 2–0 friendly loss to Martinique on 26 December 2015. He was called up to represent Guadeloupe at the 2021 CONCACAF Gold Cup.

Personal life
Tejou is the uncle of Indira Ampiot, who was crowned Miss France 2023.

References

External links
 
 

1987 births
Living people
People from Basse-Terre
Guadeloupean footballers
Guadeloupe international footballers
Association football goalkeepers
2021 CONCACAF Gold Cup players